Haqeeqat (हक़ीक़त, meaning "reality", from the Arabic word Haqq) is the Hindi translation of a controversial book by a Kerala, India-based Christian evangelist M.G. Mathew. It was translated by Daniel Nathaniel, associated with Emmanuel Mission International (EMI). The book was written as an answer to the book Bunch of Thoughts, authored by M. S. Golwalkar, the late leader of the Rashtriya Swayamsevak Sangh.The book is widely regarded as an anti-Hindu book.

The Government of Rajasthan received complaints that the book ridiculed Hindu and Jain deities and beliefs. After examining the contents of the book, the government decided to ban it, as it felt that the book could incite communal violence.

EMI's founder, M.A. Thomas, and his son, Samuel Thomas, went into hiding as the police searched for them. Joseph D'souza, president of All India Christian Council (AICC) has stated that "They Bharatiya Janata Party, the party ruling Rajasthan have declared that they would make tribal areas of Rajasthan Christian-free and are working hard on it."

Hopegivers International, one of the largest Christian ministries in India, has approached the US State Department, US senators, and Christian friends in Washington DC, after Samuel Thomas’s arrest on March 16.

Kanchan Gupta has condemned the book as an "anti-Hindu diatribe". He says:

See also
 Anti-Hinduism

References

External links
 Abusing freedom, falsifying gods  Kanchan Gupta, Pioneer,  25 March 2006
 After green doves, it's white pigeons!! - V SUNDARAM

Anti-Hindu sentiment
Evangelical Christian literature
Christianity in India
Christianity-related controversies
Missional Christianity
Propaganda in India